Vishalakshi is primarily an epithet of the Hindu goddess Parvati.

Literature

Shiva Purana 
Parvati is described to be Vishalakshi in a chapter in the Shiva Purana, when Shiva sets his eye on Parvati for the first time:

Skanda Purana 
In the Kashi Khanda of the Skanda Purana, Vishalakshi appears with Vishvanatha for grant a boon to Kubera during the Meghavahana Kalpa.
Another chapter from Kashi Khanda also offers her exultation.

Devi Bhagavata Purana 
The Devi Bhagavata Purana mentions Vishalakshi as the goddess of the Shakti Pitha of Kashi.

References 

Forms of Parvati
Hinduism
Hindu goddesses